Simon Moser (born March 10, 1989) is a Swiss professional ice hockey player who currently serves as captain of SC Bern of the National League (NL). He has formerly played in the National Hockey League with the Nashville Predators.

Playing career
He participated at the 2011 IIHF World Championship, 2012 IIHF World Championship and 2013 IIHF World Championship as a member of the Switzerland men's national ice hockey team.

While playing for the Swiss team at the 2012 IIHF World Championship, he fell awkwardly on the ice and as a result, he tore his ACL. He had to undergo season-ending surgery and turned down the Chicago Blackhawks training camp invitation. He came back to play the 35 remaining games in the 2012–13 NLA season, collecting 21 points (10G 11A).

At the end of the 2012–13 season, his team, the SCL Tigers, were relegated to the National League B. He then became a free agent before agreeing to a two-year contract with the SC Bern on June 7, 2013. Before signing with Bern, Moser accepted a try-out to the Nashville Predators 2013 training camp. Upon impressing on the eve of the 2013–14 season opener, Moser opted to use his NHL out clause with Bern and sign a one-year entry-level contract with Nashville on September 30, 2013.

He was initially reassigned to AHL affiliate, the Milwaukee Admirals, to begin the season. However, on February 1, 2014, he was recalled to Nashville and made his NHL debut against the St. Louis Blues. Moser appeared in 6 games at the NHL level in the 2013–14 season.

At the conclusion of his one-year contract with the Predators, Moser rejected a contract extension offer with Nashville and opted to return to his native Switzerland, signing an initial one-year contract with SC Bern on July 31, 2014. In the midst of the 2014–15 season with the Black Bears, Moser re-signed to an improved three-year contract with an NHL out-clause option with Bern on January 13, 2015.

Before the 2017–18 season, Moser was named captain of SC Bern, replacing Martin Plüss.

Career statistics

Regular season and playoffs

International

References

External links

1989 births
Living people
SC Bern players
Ice hockey players at the 2014 Winter Olympics
Ice hockey players at the 2018 Winter Olympics
Ice hockey players at the 2022 Winter Olympics
Olympic ice hockey players of Switzerland
Milwaukee Admirals players
Nashville Predators players
SCL Tigers players
Swiss ice hockey left wingers
Undrafted National Hockey League players
Ice hockey people from Bern